Jan van Amstel, or Jan de Hollander, (c. 1500 – c. 1542) was a Dutch Northern Renaissance painter.

Jan van Amstel was born in Amsterdam.  In or before 1528, van Amstel moved to Antwerp; in that year he joined the city's Guild of Saint Luke. He married Adriane van Doornicke, who would after his death remarry and give birth in 1544 to the future painter Gillis van Coninxloo. He is also probably the older brother of Pieter Aertsen and the brother-in-law of Pieter Coecke van Aelst.  He died in Antwerp.

Van Amstel is possibly identical to The Brunswick Monogrammist, for the signature J. V. AMSL appears on the latter's The Feeding of the Poor or Feeding of the Five Thousand

External links
    
Jan van Amstel page on Artcyclopedia
Info at the Netherlands Institute for Art History

See also
List of Dutch painters
Flemish painting

1500s births
1540s deaths
Dutch Renaissance painters
16th-century Dutch people
Early Netherlandish painters
Painters from Amsterdam
Painters from Antwerp